Cafe Carolina is the fourteenth studio album by American country music artist Don Williams. It was released in May 1984 via MCA Records. The album peaked at number 13 on the Billboard Top Country Albums chart.

Track listing
"The Only Game in Town" (Joe Allen, Ralph Murphy)
"Walkin' a Broken Heart" (Dennis Linde, Alan Rush)
"Maggie's Dream" (Dave Loggins, Lisa Silver)
"That's the Thing About Love" (Richard Leigh, Gary Nicholson)
"Leaving" (Don Williams)
"Beautiful Woman" (Graham Lyle)
"True Blue Hearts" (Williams)
"I'll Never Need Another You" (Ronnie Rogers)
"It's Time for Love" (Bob McDill, Hunter Moore)
"I'll Be Faithful to You" (Paul Kennerley)

Charts

Weekly charts

Year-end charts

Personnel

Piano & Organ: Charles Cochran
Bass: Joe Allen
Drums & Percussion: Kenny Malone
Acoustic Guitars: Billy Sanford, Don Williams
Electric Guitars: Billy Sanford, Steve Gibson
Saxophone: Jim Horn
Steel Guitar: Lloyd Green
Lead Vocals: Don Williams
Harmony Vocals: Garth Fundis, Don Williams

Production
Arrangements for Violins, Violas and Cellos: Charles Cochran
String Section: Nashville String Machine
Recorded at: Sound Emporium Studios, Nashville, Tennessee
Recording Engineers: Gary Laney & Garth Fundis
Mastered by: Glenn Meadows at Masterfonics, Nashville
Album Photography: McGuire
Album Art Direction: John Baeder

References

1984 albums
Don Williams albums
Albums produced by Garth Fundis
MCA Records albums